Nemophila aphylla, the smallflower baby blue eyes, is an annual flowering plant in the family Boraginaceae. It is endemic to the southeastern United States and typically found in rich, moist woodlands. It has very small white or pale blue flowers, typically about 0.12 inches wide, that bloom from March to May.

References

External links
Nemophila aphylla

aphylla
Flora of the Southeastern United States
Flora of the Appalachian Mountains
Plants described in 1753
Taxa named by Carl Linnaeus
Flora without expected TNC conservation status